Truvelo may refer to:

Truvelo Combi -a speed camera
Truvelo Armoury - arms manufacturing division of Truvelo Specialised Manufacturing